Rüsler Pass (el. 649 m.) is a mountain pass in the canton of Aargau in Switzerland.

It connects Oberrohrdorf and Neuenhof. The pass road is a continuation of the Heitersberg Pass road.

The pass separates the valley of the Reuss from the valley of the Limmat. The road is closed to motorized vehicles.

There is a restaurant at the summit, and it is the trail head for many trails and bike routes.

Mountain passes of Switzerland
Mountain passes of Aargau